Stanley Monroe Horton (May 6, 1916 – July 12, 2014), was an American Renewal theologian within the Pentecostal movement and the author of numerous books. He served as the senior editorial advisor for the Modern English Version Bible, and he was Distinguished Professor Emeritus of Bible and Theology at the Assemblies of God USA, Springfield, Missouri.

His degrees included an M. Div. from Gordon-Conwell Theological Seminary, an S.T.M. from Harvard University, and a Th.D. from Central Baptist Theological Seminary.  He was an ordained minister in the Assemblies of God.

Books
A prolific writer, Horton authored and co-authored numerous books:

Systematic Theology a Pentecostal Perspective
What the Bible Says About the Holy Spirit, 1976. Revised edition (2005), 
Bible Doctrines: A Pentecostal Perspective (with William Menzies), 1993. Logion Press. 
The Holy Spirit a Pentecostal Perspective by Anthony Palma (Stanley M. Horton General Editor)
Elements of a Christian Worldview by Michael Palmer (Stanley M. Horton General Editor)
Ministerial Ethics: A Guide for Spirit Filled Leaders by T. Burton Pierce (Stanley M. Horton General Editor)
They Spoke from God: A Survey of the Old Testament by Willian Williams (Stanley M. Horton Th.D General Editor)
Isaiah: A Logion Press Commentary (Foreword by Roger D. Cotton)
The Book of Acts : The Wind of the Spirit
Our Destiny: Biblical Teachings on the Last Things
Tongues and Prophecy: How to Know When a Gift of Utterance is in Order
Acts: A Logion Press Commentary
Perspectives On Spirit Baptism: Five Views (with Ralph Del Colle, H. Ray Dunning, and Larry Hart)
Missions in the Age of the Spirit by John V. York (Stanley M. Horton Th.d General Editor), 2000. Logion Press. 
Psalm in Your Heart (with George Wood)
A Commentary on I and II Corinthians
The Ultimate Victory: An Exposition of the Book of Revelation
Into All Truth: A Survey of the Course and Content of Divine Revelation
Modern English Version Bible ( Stanley M. Horton Th.D Senior Editorial Advisor) (with James Linzey Chief Editor), 2014. Passio.

References

External links
Jesus will return, Interview with Stanley Horton, Today's Pentecostal Evangel magazine, August 14, 2005

1916 births
2014 deaths
American biblical scholars
American male writers
Horton
Arminian theologians
Horton
Gordon–Conwell Theological Seminary alumni
Harvard Divinity School alumni
Pentecostal theologians
Systematic theologians